Volkov, or Volkova (feminine; Во́лкова), is a common Russian surname. It is derived from the word волк (volk, meaning "wolf").

Geographical distribution
As of 2014, 79.6% of all known bearers of the surname Volkov were residents of Russia (frequency 1:646), 6.5% of Ukraine (1:2,493), 3.9% of Belarus (1:868), 3.8% of Kazakhstan (1:1,613) and 3.3% of Uzbekistan (1:3,351).

In Russia, the frequency of the surname was higher than the national average (1:646) in the following subjects of the Russian Federation:

 1. Kostroma Oblast (1:266)
 2. Ivanovo Oblast (1:270)
 3. Mari El (1:308)
 4. Yaroslavl Oblast (1:316)
 5. Udmurtia (1:324)
 6. Ulyanovsk Oblast (1:338)
 7. Tomsk Oblast (1:364)
 8. Chuvashia (1:366)
 9. Vladimir Oblast (1:371)
 10. Magadan Oblast (1:382)
 11. Nizhny Novgorod Oblast (1:399)
 12. Jewish Autonomous Oblast (1:414)
 13. Kaluga Oblast (1:427)
 14. Tver Oblast (1:446)
 15. Moscow Oblast (1:461)
 16. Tambov Oblast (1:468)
 17. Khabarovsk Krai (1:486)
 18. Smolensk Oblast (1:487)
 19. Tula Oblast (1:487)
 20. Novosibirsk Oblast (1:499)
 21. Penza Oblast (1:532)
 22. Vologda Oblast (1:544)
 23. Sakhalin Oblast (1:559)
 24. Moscow (1:568)
 25. Kaliningrad Oblast (1:578)
 26. Pskov Oblast (1:588)
 27. Leningrad Oblast (1:594)
 28. Chukotka Autonomous Okrug (1:603)
 29. Mordovia (1:614)
 30. Ryazan Oblast (1:624)
 31. Belgorod Oblast (1:646)

People
Adrian Volkov (1827–1873), Russian genre painter
Aleksei Volkov, see there for complete list
Alexander Volkov, see there for complete list
Anatole Volkov, courier for the Silvermaster spy ring
Anatoly Volkov (1909–?), Soviet literary critic
Boris Volkov (1900–1970), Soviet stage designer
 (1894–1954), Russian poet
Dmitry Volkov, Russian volleyball player
Dmitry Volkov, Soviet swimmer
Dmitry Volkov (1718–1785), Russian statesman
Esteban Volkov, grandson of Leon Trotsky
Fyodor Volkov, "the father of the Russian theater"
Fyodor Volkov (1847–1918), Ukrainian ethnographer, anthropologist, and archaeologist
Fyodor Andreyevich Volkov (1898–1954), Soviet army officer and Hero of the Soviet Union
Igor F. Volkov, a Russian soloist with the Alexandrov Ensemble
Ilan Volkov, Israeli conductor
Ivan Volkov (b. 1954), Russian saxophone and clarinet player and jazzman
Konstantin Volkov, see there for complete list
Leonid Volkov, Russian politician
Mikhail Volkov (1922–?), Soviet army officer and Hero of the Soviet Union
Nadezhda Volkova (1920–1942), Soviet partisan and Hero of the Soviet Union
Nikolay Volkov (disambiguation), see there for complete list
Nora Volkow, Director of the National Institute on Drug Abuse, United States
Oleksandr Volkov (b. 1989), Ukrainian footballer
Olga Volkova (b. 1939), Russian actress
Olha Volkova (b. 1986), Ukrainian freestyle skier
Semyon Volkov (1845–1924), Russian revolutionary
Sergey Volkov, see there for complete list
Solomon Volkov, Russian musicologist
Valentin Volkov (painter) (1881–1964), Soviet painter
Valery Volkov, Soviet horse rider
Vasily Volkov (1840-1907), Russian painter
Vasily Stepanovich Volkov (1922–?), Soviet army officer and Hero of the Soviet Union
Vera Volkova, Russian ballet dancer
Viktor Volkov (1917–1998), Soviet aircraft pilot and Hero of the Soviet Union
Vitali Volkov, FC Torpedo Moscow midfielder
Vladimir Volkov (born 1986), Montenegrin footballer
Vladimir Volkov (musician) (born 1960), Russian contrabass player and jazzman
Vladimir Dmitriyevich Volkov (b. 1954), Chairman of the Government of the Republic of Mordovia, Russia
Vladislav Volkov, Soviet cosmonaut and twice Hero of the Soviet Union
Volkov (crater), a lunar crater bearing his name
1790 Volkov, an asteroid bearing his name
Yefim Volkov (1844–1920), Russian landscape painter
Yulia Volkova, member of the group t.A.T.u.
Zinaida Volkova, Russian Marxist, daughter of Leon Trotsky
Yuri Volkov, retired Soviet ice hockey player

In fiction 
 Volkov, a cyborg supersoldier created by the Soviet Union in the computer game Command & Conquer: Red Alert.
 Ivan Volkov, a Bulgarian Quidditch player featured in J.K. Rowling's 2000 fantasy novel Harry Potter and the Goblet of Fire.
 Ivan Volkov, a fictional powerful Russian (probably born Soviet) memorabilia collector played by Savannah's actor father in Swindle.

References

Russian-language surnames